Alexander Nikolayevich Petrov (born 20 January 1990) is a former Russian professional football player.

Club career
He made his professional debut in the Russian Football National League on 31 March 2010 for FC Khimki in a game against FC Avangard Kursk. That was his only season in the FNL.

In February 2012, Petrov is on trial in Bulgarian side Botev Plovdiv.

External links
 Career summary by sportbox.ru

References

1990 births
Footballers from Saint Petersburg
Living people
Russian footballers
Association football midfielders
FC Zenit Saint Petersburg players
FC Khimki players
FC Taganrog players